Phosphoenolpyruvate carboxykinase (diphosphate)  is an enzyme with systematic name diphosphate:oxaloacetate carboxy-lyase (transphosphorylating; phosphoenolpyruvate-forming). This enzyme catalyses the following chemical reaction

 diphosphate + oxaloacetate  phosphate + phosphoenolpyruvate + CO2

This enzyme also catalyses the reaction: 
phosphoenolpyruvate + GTP + CO2  pyruvate + GDP.

It is transcriptionally upregulated in the liver by glucagon.

See also 
 Phosphoenolpyruvate carboxykinase

References

External links 
 

EC 4.1.1